Gary Haluska (born March 17, 1950) is a former Democratic member of the Pennsylvania House of Representatives.

References

External links
Pennsylvania House of Representatives - Gary Haluska (Democrat) official PA House website
Pennsylvania House Democratic Caucus - Gary Haluska official Party website

Living people
Democratic Party members of the Pennsylvania House of Representatives
1950 births
21st-century American politicians